p-ANCA, or MPO-ANCA, or perinuclear anti-neutrophil cytoplasmic antibodies, are antibodies that stain the material around the nucleus of a neutrophil. They are a special class of anti-neutrophil cytoplasmic antibodies.

This pattern occurs because the vast majority of the antigens targeted by ANCAs are highly cationic (positively charged) at pH 7.00. During ethanol (pH ~7.0 in water) fixation, antigens which are more cationic migrate and localize around the nucleus, attracted by its negatively charged DNA content.  Antibody staining therefore results in fluorescence of the region around the nucleus.

Targets
p-ANCAs stain the perinuclear region by binding to specific targets. By far the most common p-ANCA target is myeloperoxidase (MPO), a neutrophil granule protein whose primary role in normal metabolic processes is generation of oxygen radicals.

ANCA will less commonly form against alternative antigens that may also result in a p-ANCA pattern. These include lactoferrin, elastase, and cathepsin G.

When the condition is a vasculitis, the target is usually MPO. However, the proportion of p-ANCA sera with anti-MPO antibodies has been reported to be as low as 12%.

Medical conditions
p-ANCA is associated with several medical conditions:

 It is fairly specific, but not sensitive for ulcerative colitis, so is not useful as a sole diagnostic test. When measured together with anti-saccharomyces cerevisiae antibodies (ASCA), p-ANCA has been estimated to have a specificity of 97% and a sensitivity of 48% in differentiating patients with ulcerative colitis from normal controls.
 Approximately 50% of cases of eosinophilic granulomatosis with polyangiitis
 A majority of primary sclerosing cholangitis 
 Microscopic polyangiitis
  Focal necrotizing and crescentic glomerulonephritis
 Rheumatoid arthritis

See also
 C-ANCA
 Anti-neutrophil cytoplasmic antibody (ANCA)

References

Autoantibodies